German–Soviet Commercial Agreement can refer to several agreements between Nazi Germany and the Soviet Union:

 German–Soviet Credit Agreement (1939), August 19, 1939
 German–Soviet Commercial Agreement (1940), February 11, 1940
 German–Soviet Border and Commercial Agreement (1941), January 10, 1941